Believe is the seventeenth studio album by Italian tenor Andrea Bocelli. The album was released on 13 November 2020 by Sugar Music and Decca Records.

Track listing

Charts

Weekly charts

Year-end charts

Certifications

References

2020 albums
Andrea Bocelli albums
Decca Records albums